Hajjiabad (also Romanized as Ḩājjīābād) is a village in Chah Varz Rural District, in the Central District of Lamerd County, Fars Province, Iran. In the 2006 census, its population was 334, in 72 families.

References 

 Populated places in Lamerd County